Nestor Assogba (21 February 1929 – 22 August 2017) was a Beninese Catholic archbishop.

Assogba was born in Abomey. He was ordained as a priest on 21 December 1957 and appointed Bishop of Parakou on 10 April 1976. He was ordained on 25 July that year. He served as Archbishop of Parakou from 16 October 1997 until 29 October 1999, when he was appointed Archbishop of Cotonou. He served in Cotonou for 5 years before retiring from service on 5 March 2005.

References

External links
Catholic Hierarchy page 

Beninese Roman Catholic archbishops
1929 births
2017 deaths
People from Abomey
Roman Catholic archbishops of Cotonou